is a Japanese wrestling coach and retired wrestler who won several medals in the 62 kg category at the Asian and world level between 1983 and 1989. Remarkably, at the 1983 Asian Wrestling Championships, he won a gold medal in the freestyle wrestling and a silver in the Greco-Roman wrestling. After retiring from competitions he worked as a national coach, training Saori Yoshida, Kaori Icho, Hitomi Obara, Chiharu Icho and Eri Tosaka, among others.

References

External links
 

Olympic wrestlers of Japan
Wrestlers at the 1988 Summer Olympics
1960 births
Living people
Japanese male sport wrestlers
World Wrestling Championships medalists
Asian Games silver medalists for Japan
Medalists at the 1986 Asian Games
Asian Games medalists in wrestling
Wrestlers at the 1986 Asian Games
People from the Amami Islands
20th-century Japanese people